Gåsgränd (Swedish: "Goose Alley") is an alley in Gamla stan, the old town in central Stockholm, Sweden.  Connecting the streets Västerlånggatan, Stora Nygatan, and Lilla Nygatan, it forms a parallel street to Ignatiigränd and Överskärargränd, and leads down to the square Munkbron on the western waterfront of the old town.  On the upper stretch of the alley is a small square, Gåstorget.

History
In the 15th and 16th century, the alley was named Grågåsens gränd ("Alley of the Grey-Goose") after a woman, Ragnhild Grågås, who lived in the alley around 1500.  It is mentioned in 1492 as Gragasenne grendh and referred to a few years later as nest nordan hwstrv Ragnil Gragossenne gardh ("next north of wife Ragnil Gragossenne's homestead").  In 1513, a Gragasene grend is mentioned as is an old house Ragnil Gragas geffuit hade j testament ("...given had in [the] testament").

During the 17th century however the most commonly used name for the alley was Anders Siggessons gränd ("Alley of Anders Siggesson", 1594), and a hundred years later Saltmätargränd ("Salt Gauger's Alley", 1669), most likely after a Bertil Mattsson who bought a property in the alley in 1652.  On a map dated 1733, the western part is marked as Saltmätargränd, while the eastern is called Gåsgränd, the former made a section of the latter in 1885.

See also 
 List of streets and squares in Gamla stan

References

External links 
 hitta.se - Location map

Streets in Stockholm